The Association of Salaried Medical Specialists (ASMS) is a trade union in New Zealand that represents the professional and industrial interests of just over 5000 senior salaried doctors and dentists employed by public hospitals and other employers of health care professionals, including the Family Planning Association, ACC, hospices, community trusts, Iwi health authorities, union health centres and the New Zealand Blood Service.

The ASMS is an affiliate of the New Zealand Council of Trade Unions.

The objectives of the ASMS are to:

 promote the right of equal access for all New Zealanders to high quality health services
 articulate members’ professional concerns and interests to the Government
 contribute to public debate and discussion about the provision of health services in New Zealand
 advise and represents members on matters related to their employment agreements
 negotiates collective employment agreements
 support workplace empowerment and clinical leadership

External links

References 

New Zealand Council of Trade Unions
Healthcare trade unions in New Zealand